Marjan Mrmić (born 6 May 1965) is a Croatian former professional footballer who played as a goalkeeper. He currently works as the goalkeeping coach of the Croatia national team.

Club career
Mrmić started his career at hometown in Mladost Petrinja in 1983 and moved to Dinamo Vinkovci in 1988. He left the club in 1993, when it was already renamed to Cibalia, and moved to Varteks. In 1996, Mrmić left Varteks for Turkish club Beşiktaş and spent two seasons there before eventually returning to the Varteks in 1998. By the end of his playing career, he also had a short spell with Belgian club Charleroi, but made only seven league appearances for the club and returned to Varteks, where he finished his playing career in 2000 and continued to work for the club as the first assistant coach, as well as the goalkeeping coach.

International career
Between 1995 and 1999, Mrmić won a total of 14 international caps for Croatia, mainly being the national team's second-choice goalkeeper during the period.

He made his international debut on 11 June 1995 in a 1–0 defeat to Ukraine in Kiev during the UEFA Euro 1996 qualifying, coming on as a substitute for Dubravko Pavličić in the 27th minute, following a red card to Tonči Gabrić. He made his second appearance in the qualifying on 3 September 1995 in a 7–1 win at home to Estonia, coming on as a substitute for Dražen Ladić in the 29th minute.

Prior to the UEFA Euro 1996 finals, Mrmić appeared in three friendly matches, also playing the full 90 minutes in a goalless draw against England at Wembley. During the finals, he was Croatia's second-choice goalkeeper, with Dražen Ladić being the first choice, and made his only appearance in their final group match, a 3–0 defeat to Portugal.

Mrmić went on to make three appearances in the 1998 FIFA World Cup qualifying, which included playing the full 90 minutes in the second leg of the playoffs against Ukraine. He was also part of the 22-man squad that won the bronze medals at the 1998 FIFA World Cup finals, but did not make an appearance during the tournament.

In January 1999, Mrmić won his only international cap for Croatia B in a friendly match against France B. He also continued to be Croatia's second-choice goalkeeper during the UEFA Euro 2000 qualifying. His only appearance in the qualifying came in a 2–1 win at home to Malta on 21 August 1999. It eventually turned out to be his final international appearance, as he retired from international football two months later, following Croatia's failure to qualify for the finals.

Coaching career
Mrmić has been the goalkeeping coach of the Croatia national team since 2006, also working as the goalkeeping coach of Varteks and Turkish sides, Beşiktaş and Antalyaspor, between 2006 and 2019.

Honours

Player

Beşiktaş
 Turkish Cup: 1998
 Chancellor Cup: 1997
 TSYD Cup: 1997

Goalkeeping coach

Croatia
 FIFA World Cup runner-up: 2018

Orders
 Order of the Croatian Interlace – 1998

References

External links
 

1965 births
Living people
People from Sisak
Association football goalkeepers
Yugoslav footballers
Croatian footballers
Croatia international footballers
UEFA Euro 1996 players
1998 FIFA World Cup players
HNK Cibalia players
NK Varaždin players
Beşiktaş J.K. footballers
R. Charleroi S.C. players
Croatian Football League players
Süper Lig players
Belgian Pro League players
Croatian expatriate footballers
Expatriate footballers in Turkey
Croatian expatriate sportspeople in Turkey
Expatriate footballers in Belgium
Croatian expatriate sportspeople in Belgium
Association football goalkeeping coaches
Beşiktaş J.K. non-playing staff
Antalyaspor non-playing staff